Alla Petrivna Kudlai (born 23 July 1954) is a Ukrainian singer.  In 1987 she was awarded Merited Artist of Ukraine (Заслужений артист України), and in 1997, People's Artist of Ukraine (Народний артист України)

Early days and education
Kudlai was born in Losynivka, Nizhyn Raion, Chernihiv Oblast, and studied at Nizhyn Gogol State University.

Career

In 1978 Kudlai joined the Veryovka Ukrainian Folk Choir.

In 1984 she became a soloist of the Ukrainian State Television and Radio symphony orchestra.

In 2003 she performed three sold-out solo concerts at the National Palace of Culture to celebrate 25 years of her career.

She is godmother to Nastya Kamensky.

References

External links

1954 births
Living people
20th-century Ukrainian women singers
21st-century Ukrainian women singers
Nizhyn Gogol State University alumni
Recipients of the title of Merited Artist of Ukraine
Recipients of the title of People's Artists of Ukraine